Llyn Gwynant is a lake in Snowdonia, Wales.

Llyn Gwynant lies on the River Glaslyn, in the Nant Gwynant valley, and is about 1¼ miles (2 km) north east of Llyn Dinas; the village of Bethania lies between them.

Snowdon lies 2 miles (3 km) to the north west.  The lake is natural, having been formed by glacial action and is 120 acres (50 hectares) in size. It is a popular place for canoeing and kayaking with easy access from the A498 road which runs along its south bank.

It was used as a filming location in the 2003 film 'Lara Croft Tomb Raider: The Cradle of Life'.

The view towards Llyn Gwynant and Moel Hebog is one of the most photographed in Snowdonia.

External links
Llyn Gwynant Campsite
Film Locations
www.geograph.co.uk : photos of Llyn Gwynant and surrounding area

Beddgelert
Gwynant
Gwynant
Tourism in Gwynedd
Tourism in Snowdonia